USS Cacique (ID-2213) was a freighter leased by the United States Navy in World War I. She was used to transport Allied personnel and cargo in support of the European fighting front. Post-war she was returned to her owners.

Built in England
SS Cacique, a 6,202 Gross register ton commercial freighter, was built in 1910 by Short Brothers of Sunderland, England. She was owned by the New York and Pacific Steamship Company of New York City. On 19 August 1918 she was transferred to the Navy from the United States Shipping Board and commissioned the same day as USS Cacique (ID # 2213).

World War I service
Assigned to the Naval Overseas Transportation Service, Cacique sailed from Norfolk, Virginia on 30 August 1918 to take part in supplying the United States Army in France. She made two voyages to Marseilles, France with general cargo, and returned to Baltimore, Maryland on 2 March 1919.

Post-war disposition
After the November 1918 Armistice with Germany Cacique was decommissioned 24 March 1919, and returned to the US Shipping Board the same day. She was then returned to her owners.

References
 
 Steamship Cacique (American Freighter, 1910). Served as USS Cacique (ID # 2213) in 1918-1919
 NavSource Online: Cacique (ID 2213)

World War I auxiliary ships of the United States
Ships built on the River Wear
1910 ships
Cargo ships of the United States Navy